<onlyinclude>

October 2022

See also

References

killings by law enforcement officers
 10